Timiskaming—Cochrane is a provincial electoral district in northern Ontario, Canada. It elects one member to the Legislative Assembly of Ontario.

History

The riding was created in 1999 from parts of Cochrane North, Cochrane South, Timiskaming, Nickel Belt, Sudbury East and Nipissing.

In 1996, Ontario was divided into the same electoral districts as those used for federal electoral purposes. They were redistributed whenever a readjustment took place at the federal level.

In 2005, legislation was passed by the Legislature to divide Ontario into 107 electoral districts, beginning with the next provincial election in 2007. The eleven northern electoral districts are those defined for federal purposes in 1996, based on the 1991 census (except for a minor boundary adjustment). The 96 southern electoral districts are those defined for federal electoral purposes in 2003, based on the 2001 census. Without this legislation, the number of electoral districts in Northern Ontario would have been reduced from eleven to ten.

Geography

The riding includes the southeastern corner of the Cochrane District, all of Timiskaming, the southeastern corner of the Sudbury District, and the northern third of Nipissing District.

Included in the riding is the city of Temiskaming Shores and the towns of Cochrane, Iroquois Falls, Kirkland Lake, Larder Lake, McGarry, Englehart, Earlton, Cobalt, West Nipissing, and French River.

Members

Election results

2007 electoral reform referendum

References

Elections Ontario Past Election Results
 Elections Ontario
1999 results
2003 results
2007 results
Map of riding for 2018 election

Ontario provincial electoral districts
Kirkland Lake
Temiskaming Shores
West Nipissing